Naved Aslam (born 23 November) is an Indian film, television and theatre actor and screenwriter. He has been an actor, director and screenwriter, respectively for TV shows, theater plays and feature films. In 2018, Aslam made his digital debut in the web-series Smoke (running from 2018 to 2019).

Early life and education 

Naved Aslam was born and brought up in Delhi, where his father served as an Urdu literature professor at Jawaharlal Nehru University, while his mother was a high school teacher at a government school. Aslam has been trained in the classical Indian vocal music and has pursued a postgraduate degree in mass communications from Jamia Millia Islamia University based in Delhi. It was his father who introduced him to the theatre. Aslam has written, directed and acted in stage plays for over 10 years.

Career 
Aslam, moved to Mumbai to pursue his ambition of becoming a director, after a decade in theatre. Initially, he spent over 2 years working on some of the international projects. Afterwards, Aslam turned actor and made his first acting television debut in DD National's Byomkesh Bakshi in the year 1993. He had another breakthrough in 1996 by Sony TV's medical drama Hospital. Aslam is best known for playing the role of Chand Raichand in the Indian supernatural television series Pyaar Kii Ye Ek Kahaani, where he played a 1000 year old supernatural vampire. Apart from working in television, Aslam has played roles in feature films such as Once Upon a Time in Mumbaai, a 2010 film produced by the Balaji Motion Pictures and Honeymoon Travels Pvt. Ltd.

Filmography

Television

Film

Notes

References

External links 
 

Living people
Male actors from Delhi
Indian male film actors
Indian male television actors
Indian male stage actors
Indian television directors
Indian television writers
Jamia Millia Islamia alumni
Year of birth missing (living people)